Rhein-Sieg-Kreis II is an electoral constituency (German: Wahlkreis) represented in the Bundestag. It elects one member via first-past-the-post voting. Under the current constituency numbering system, it is designated as constituency 98. It is located in southwestern North Rhine-Westphalia, comprising the western part of the Rhein-Sieg-Kreis district.

Rhein-Sieg-Kreis II was created for the 1980 federal election. Since 1994, it has been represented by Norbert Röttgen of the Christian Democratic Union (CDU).

Geography
Rhein-Sieg-Kreis II is located in southwestern North Rhine-Westphalia. As of the 2021 federal election, it comprises the municipalities of Alfter, Bad Honnef, Bornheim, Königswinter, Meckenheim, Rheinbach, Sankt Augustin, Swisttal, and Wachtberg from the Rhein-Sieg-Kreis district.

History
Rhein-Sieg-Kreis II was created in 1980 and contained parts of the redistributed Rhein-Sieg-Kreis I constituency. In the 1980 through 1998 elections, it was constituency 65 in the numbering system. From 2002 through 2009, it was number 99. Since the 2013 election, it has been number 98. Its borders have not changed since its creation.

Members
The constituency has been held continuously by the Christian Democratic Union (CDU) since its creation. It was first represented by Franz Möller 1980 to 1994. Since 1994, it has been represented by Norbert Röttgen.

Election results

2021 election

2017 election

2013 election

2009 election

References

Federal electoral districts in North Rhine-Westphalia
Rhein-Sieg-Kreis
Constituencies established in 1980